Greer County, a county created by the Texas legislature on February 8, 1860 (and was named for John Alexander Greer, Lieutenant Governor of Texas), was land claimed by both Texas and the United States. The region of Greer County is now in present-day Oklahoma.

Origin of the dispute
The dispute arose from a map submitted with the Adams–Onís Treaty of 1819. The treaty stated that the boundary between the French claims on the north and the Spanish claims on the south was Rio Roxo de Natchitoches (Red River) until it reached the 100th meridian west as noted on John Melish's map published in 1818. Texas claimed the land south of the North Fork (red on the map) and the United States claimed the land north of the South Fork (blue on the map, later called the Prairie Dog Town Fork Red River).

United States vs. State of Texas

The dispute resulted in a lawsuit, which was heard by the Supreme Court under its original jurisdiction. The Court's opinion, in United States v. State of Texas , issued on March 16, held that the land of some  belonged to the United States. Following that ruling, on May 4, 1896, the land was officially assigned by Congress to Oklahoma Territory.

Legacy
When Oklahoma became the 46th U.S. state on November 16, 1907, old "Greer County" was divided into Greer, Jackson, and southwest Beckham counties. Harmon County was created May 22, 1909 by a vote of the people from a portion of Greer County.

See also

 Oklahoma
 Greer County, Oklahoma
 Harmon County, Oklahoma
 Jackson County, Oklahoma 
 Beckham County, Oklahoma
 Texas Panhandle
 Childress County, Texas
 Collingsworth County, Texas
 Hardeman County, Texas
 List of extinct United States counties

References
Estill-Harbour, Emma, Ph.D. "Greer County", Chronicles of Oklahoma 12:2 (June 1934) 145-162 (retrieved August 16, 2006).

External links
 

Former counties of Texas
Pre-statehood history of Oklahoma
Texas border disputes
Red River of the South
1896 disestablishments in Texas